Maharaj Singh  was an Indian politician. He was elected to the Lok Sabha, the lower house of the Parliament of India from the Mainpuri constituency of Uttar Pradesh as a member of the Indian National Congress.

References

Indian National Congress politicians
Lok Sabha members from Uttar Pradesh
India MPs 1967–1970
India MPs 1971–1977
Possibly living people
Year of birth missing